Lefevrea leroyi is a species of leaf beetle. It is distributed in the Democratic Republic of the Congo, Sudan and Ivory Coast. It was first described by the Belgian entomologist  in 1940. Host plants for the species include the aerial parts of Gramineae, and Combretum spp.

References 

Eumolpinae
Beetles of Africa
Beetles of the Democratic Republic of the Congo
Insects of Sudan
Insects of West Africa
Beetles described in 1940